The All Electric Amusement Arcade is a seven-part British children's television serial aired on ITV in 1983. The show is a musical drama, with nearly every episode featuring an original song performed by in-universe band Electric Arc.

The first episode of the series is available at the BFI Mediatheque at the BFI Southbank.

Premise
Fifteen-year-old Bella Harper dreams of moving to Hollywood and becoming an actress. However, she is stuck in her hometown Graystone Beach with her broken family, so takes it upon herself to earn enough money to get her to her dream. She makes a deal with Mr Thomsett -  manager of local dilapidated arcade 
The All Electric Amusement Arcade; if she can turn around the fortunes of the arcade, she earns 20% of the profits. With the help of local band Electric Arc, she decides to renovate the arcade into an events space for the youth of the town.

Cast

Main
Bella Harper (Lorraine Brunning)
Jake (Tim Whitnall)
Marcus (Steven Woodcock) 
Deshaun (Joanne Campbell)
Cass (Heather Taylor)
Dale (Michael Lee Osborn)
Mr Thomsett (Gordon Gostelow)
Robert Harper (David Collings)
Susan Harper (Janet Dale)
Gran (Liz Smith)
Perry Harper (Alan Bowyer)

Minor
Mrs Thomsett (Barbara Lott)
Daffyd Williams (Tenniel Evans)
Star Base (Heather Alexander)
Mr McMorrow (Leo Dolan)
Hawk (Clive Griffin)
Councillor Hogan (Kenneth MacDonald)
Councillor Warren (Joan Newell)
Danny (Lee Towsey)
David Jensen also appears as himself.

Episodes

Tie-in Merchandise

7" Single
A single of one of Electric Arc's songs - "Honky Town Rap" - was released in 1983 by Red Bus Records. The B-side - "Just Another Song" is the theme tune to the show.

Novelisation
A novelisation of the series, by creator Gerard Macdonald, was released in September 1983 to coincide with the show's transmission. It was published by Fontana Lions in a paperback format.

References

External links
 

1983 British television series debuts
1983 British television series endings
1980s British children's television series
ITV children's television shows
British children's musical television series
British teen drama television series
Television series about teenagers
Television series by Fremantle (company)
Television shows produced by Thames Television
English-language television shows